The 2007 UCI Indoor Cycling World Championships took place in Winterthur in switzerland from 9 to 11 November and crowned world champions in the cycling disciplines of cycle ball and artistic cycling. Germany managed to get all seven gold medals at this championship and won 11 medals in total - including all three in men's single artistic cycling.

The whole event was located in the stadium Eulachhalle, originally the home stadium of the handball club Pfadi Winterthur. It was actually the second indoor cycling world championship held in Winterthur after the one in 1997.

In total 144 athletes out of 21 nations took part in the competition. The participating nations were all from Europe and Asia, except for a Tchad starting Czech team.

Organisation 
The idea to give Winterthur another world championship indoor cycling after the one in 1997 came from Marianne Kern, member of the RMV Pfungen and member of the management board of Swiss Cycling for indoor cycling. After the candidature of Winterthur was made public the other candidates revoke their candidatures so that Winterthur could perform the World Championship. The whole event had a budget of 750'000 swiss francs - after the end of the WC they made a profit of 29'600 SFr.

The organising committee 
 Daniel Frei, president
 Max Wullschleger, finances
 Marianne Kern, sport
 Toni Hostettler, marketing
 Daniel Spengler, infrastructure

The members of the OC are all out of the city and the region of Winterthur.

Venue 
The whole event took place in the Eulachhalle in Winterthur. During the event one hall was used for the sporting events and the other was an event hall, where you could eat and also a cultural program was there. In the entrance area there were some exhibitors, a bar, a coat check and an information desk. The Eulachhalle was sold out during the whole event with 3,280 spectators, a hall record.

Medals table

Cycle ball 
Es wurde ein 2er-Teamwettkampf bei den Herren durchgeführt.

Modus 
The competitors started in three different groups, ordered after their strengthen. In group A the fight for the medals took place. In all groups they compete in the league mode against each other. For group B and C the table afterward is the final results.

In group A there was also an intermediate stage where the 2nd- against the 5th-placed and the 3rd against the 4th placed played. The winners came into a final round with the winner of the first round. The two first teams of the final round make out the world cup winner in a final game at the end.

Group A 
In the group A Germany could win the final game against Austria with 6:4. Top goal scorer was the Austrian player Martin Lingg.

Relegation game group A/B 
 -  3:2

Group B

Relegation game group B/C 
 -  6:4

Group C

Artistic cycling 
There were competitions in single, pair and four-man-team for women and in single and pair for men.

Modus 
At first there was a qualification round with all athletes. The four best athletes could fight for the medals in the final.

Women

Single 
In total 23 athletes out of 12 nations participated in that discipline.

final table

Pair 
In total 14 teams out of 9 nations participated in that discipline. The German team Schulheis/Sprinkmeier made in qualification round with 316.39 points a new world record.

final table

Four-Man-Team 
Beside the finalists Hungary and France had a team, but they had both no chances for the finals.

final table

Men

Single 
In total 23 Athletes out of 13 nations participated in that discipline.

final table

Pair 
In total 12 Doubles out of 7 nations participated in that discipline.

final table

References

Websites 
 Official website of the Indoor Cycling-WC 2007 

UCI Indoor Cycling World Championships
International cycle races hosted by Switzerland
Uci Indoor Cycling World Championships, 2007
Winterthur
2007 in cycle racing